Skinningrove is a village in Redcar and Cleveland, North Yorkshire, England.
Its name is of Old Norse etymology and is thought to mean skinners' grove or pit.

History 

The village had an agricultural and fishing economy until the opening of local ironstone workings in 1848 initiated an industrialisation boom.
A railway was built by 1865, and iron smelting began in 1874.
A jetty on the coast built in 1880 allowed seagoing vessels to carry heavy cargoes from the area. Mining continued until 1958 and primary iron production until the 1970s.

Oarfish 

On 17 February 2003, a rarely seen oarfish was caught by angler Val Fletcher, using a fishing rod baited with squid.
The fish was 11 ft 4 in (3.3 m) long and weighed 140 lb (63.5 kg). Graham Hill, the science officer at the Deep, an aquarium in Hull, said that he had never heard of another oarfish being caught off the coast of Britain.
The Natural History Museum in London said that it would have been interested in preserving the fish in its permanent collection; however the fish had been 'cut up into steaks' before any scientists could examine it.

Landmarks 

The Cleveland Ironstone Mining Museum (formerly the Tom Leonard Mining Museum) describes the village's mining heritage, providing a unique underground experience and an insight into how 6.2 million tons of ironstone was extracted from Skinningrove.
The village has a large natural sand beach used for recreational fishing and a beck, which occasionally floods, notably in 2000.
It also has the Riverside Building Community Centre which is on the site of a former school.
There is a Methodist chapel which has services on a Sunday at 18:00. There is also a fish and chip shop, a community centre and general dealers and post office.

Culture and events 

Every year Skinningrove hosts a bonfire and fireworks display which attracts hundreds of people from around North Yorkshire. Each year the bonfire is based on a different theme.
The Cleveland Way runs through the village.

Photographer Chris Killip created an unpublished photo series about the town's residents in the early 1980s, about which the American filmmaker Michael Almereyda produced a short film. The film won Best Non-Fiction Short at the 2012 Sundance Film Festival.

See also 
 Skinningrove railway station

References

External links 

 Cleveland Ironstone Mining Museum
 Skinningrove Bonfire
 .

Villages in North Yorkshire
Places in the Tees Valley
Populated coastal places in Redcar and Cleveland
Loftus, North Yorkshire